The UCD School of Medicine (Scoil an Leighis UCD) at University College Dublin, Ireland, was founded in 1854. At undergraduate level, the school offers programmes in Medicine MB BCh BAO (undergraduate and graduate entry), BSc Biomedical Health and Life Sciences, and the BSc Radiography. At graduate level, the school UCD offers over 40 programmes for health care professionals.

History
The Catholic University Medical School was founded in 1854 and in 1908 it became the medical faculty of UCD. After 75 years at its original location on Cecilia Street, it moved to Earlsfort Terrace. In 2007 UCD moved again, to Belfield campus. The Health Science building sits adjacent to the Conway Institute (a biomedical and biomolecular research centre), Ireland's Centre for Research in Infectious Diseases, and the Centre for Synthesis and Chemical Biology. The UCD National Virus Reference Laboratory is also located on the Belfield campus.

The University College Dublin degree in Radiography is the oldest in Europe with the first graduates being conferred in 1994. It is the only Diagnostic Imaging Programme in the Republic of Ireland.

Medical school curriculum 
A pre-medicine year is completed by approximately 85% of undergraduate entry students. Thereafter, undergraduate entry medical students embark upon a three-year pre-clinical programme, followed by their final two years of clinical training in one of the affiliated teaching hospitals, either St. Vincent’s University Hospital or the Mater Misericordiae University Hospital. Graduate entry medical students study a 2-year-pre-clinical programme and study the final two years in the affiliated hospitals. Both graduate and undergraduate students complete specialist training rotations at The National Maternity Hospital, the Coombe Women & Infants University Hospital, Children's Health Ireland at Crumlin, and Children's Health Ireland at Temple Street. Upon graduation students are awarded bachelor's degrees in medicine, surgery and obstetrics.

In September 2005 there was a restructuring of the medical programme in the systems-based model, as part of a university wide implementation.

UCD has connections with several prestigious North American institutions, allowing medical students to participate in funded electives at Harvard Medical School, Washington University in St. Louis, University of Pennsylvania, University of Toronto and the University of British Columbia. The medical school also has a twinning medical programme with the RCSI & UCD Malaysia Campus.

Admissions and rankings
In 2020, of the five medical schools offering medical degrees to undergraduates in the Republic of Ireland, UCD had the highest required CAO points to gain entry, at 737. In 2021 points required for undergraduate entry into UCD Medicine rose from 737 to 743, tied with Trinity for the highest requirement.
Likewise in 2022, UCD once again was tied with Trinity for highest required CAO points at 743, to study medicine in Ireland. In the subject listed as "Medicine", the 2022 QS World University Rankings gave University College Dublin a ranking of 151–200. The US News 2022 "Best Global Universities for Clinical Medicine" rankings gave UCD a position of 228 among 1,000 schools scored, the highest among Irish schools.

For American applicants who wish to enter the four-year graduate entry medical program, the minimum GPA required from a completed undergraduate degree program is 3.0 and the MCAT must be a 503 or higher.

Global graduate destinations
UCD students have secured residencies at (but not limited to) the following training programmes:
Baylor College of Medicine – Texas, US
Beth Israel Deaconess Medical Center – Massachusetts, US
Cleveland Clinic – Ohio, US
Columbia University Irving Medical Center – New York, US
Dartmouth–Hitchcock Medical Center – New Hampshire, US
Emory University Hospital – Atlanta, US
Hospital of the University of Pennsylvania – Philadelphia, US
Massachusetts General Hospital, Harvard Medical School – Boston, Massachusetts, US
Mayo Clinic College of Medicine and Science – Minnesota, US
McMaster University Medical School – Hamilton, Ontario, Canada
Monash Health – Melbourne, Australia
NYU Langone Health – New York, US
Pennsylvania Hospital, University of Pennsylvania Health System – Philadelphia, US
Stanford International Residency Training Programme – Stanford, California
Singapore General Hospital – Singapore
University of British Columbia – Vancouver, Canada
University of Melbourne – Melbourne, Australia
University of Toronto – Toronto, Canada
Westmead Hospital – Sydney, NSW, Australia
Yale New Haven Hospital – Connecticut, US

Notable alumni
Notable UCD alumni and former students of the School of Medicine include:
Peter Boylan – Obstetrician, former master of the National Maternity Hospital, Dublin
Hugh Brady – President of UCD, President of Imperial College London
Barry Bresnihan – Rheumatologist, Irish rugby international, British and Irish Lion
Mark English – 800 m bronze medalist at the 2014 European Athletics Championships
Garret A. FitzGerald – Professor of translational medicine and Therapeutics and chair of the department of pharmacology at the Perelman School of Medicine of the University of Pennsylvania.  His work contributed substantially to the development of low-dose aspirin to prevent heart attacks and strokes. His work showing that selective COX-2 inhibitors depress the production of prostacyclin in the endothelium, thereby increasing cardiovascular risk,[9] was instrumental in the withdrawal of Vioxx (rofecoxib) from the U.S. market in 2004
Michael Fitzsimons – 8-time All-Ireland Senior Football Champion for Dublin
Noëlle Healy – 4-time All-Ireland Senior Ladies' Football Champion
Tony Holohan – Chief Medical Officer for Ireland
Maura Lynch – Catholic nun, doctor, women's rights advocate, founding member of the Association of Surgeons in Uganda, North–South Prize recipient
Jack McCaffrey – five-time All-Ireland Senior Football Champion for Dublin
Gerry McEntee – two-time All-Ireland Senior Football Champion for Meath, Consultant Hepatobiliary and pancreatic surgeon at the Mater Misericordiae University Hospital 
Eilis McGovern – 168th President of the Royal College of Surgeons in Ireland and first female President of any surgical Royal College in the world
Patrick Meenan – President of the Medical Council of Ireland, lawyer, president of the Royal Zoological Society of Ireland, acting President of UCD and dean of the faculty of medicine in University College Dublin
Bill Mulcahy – Irish rugby international, British and Irish Lion
Josh Murphy – Connacht and Leinster Rugby player
Seán Murphy – three-time All-Ireland Senior Football Champion for Kerry
Lucy O'Brien – Missionary nun, medical doctor
Paul O'Byrne – Pulmonologist, Dean and Vice President-elect of the Faculty of Health Sciences and Dean of the Michael G. DeGroote School of Medicine at McMaster University, former Chair of Respiratory Medicine at McMaster University Medical School
Mona Tyndall – medical doctor and missionary nun in Nigeria and Zambia

List of deans 
Below is a list of the deans of the UCD School of Medicine, Cecilia Street School of Medicine and the Catholic University Medical School:

See also
Mater Misericordiae University Hospital
St. Vincent's University Hospital
Dublin Hospitals Rugby Cup

References

External links
School of Medicine

University College Dublin
Medical schools in the Republic of Ireland
1855 establishments in Ireland